The Ponce Plaza Hotel & Casino, formerly Ponce Ramada Hotel and Ponce Plaza Ramada Hotel, is a five-story hotel in Ponce, Puerto Rico. The hotel opened in the summer of 2009 and is known for the historic value of its structure: its main entrance is a historic colonial structure known as "Casa Saurí" (Saurí House). In February 2013, the hotel expanded its facilities to include a casino, a cocktail lounge, and a 4-story, 200-car parking garage. On 1 July 2014, the owners left the Ramada namesake franchise and renamed the hotel Ponce Plaza Hotel & Casino.

Location and features
The hotel is located in the Ponce Historic Zone. It has two major buildings. The first building facing Plaza Muñoz Rivera is the historic Casa Saurí structure and it houses six colonial-style rooms plus the hotel's Lola Eclectic Cuisine restaurant. The rear building located on the southeast corner of Calle Reina and Calle Mendez Vigo is a modern four-story structure housing 64 additional guest rooms as well as an indoor parking garage on the first floor and a fitness center on the fourth floor. There is also an outdoor swimming pool.

Design
The hotel was designed in 2006-2009 by architects Fernando Bonnín and Javier Bonnín of Ponce, Puerto Rico.

History
The historic 1882 Casa Saurí-Rubert was meticulously rebuilt to accommodate the hotel."  On the first floor of this Casa Saurí building the hotel now houses its front desk, lobby, conference room/breakfast room, and restaurant. The second floor accommodates six colonial-style guest rooms. These six rooms are all designed to follow 19th century historic themes.  The hotel was built with incentives under Law 212 of the Commonwealth.  Félix Sauri y Vivas was a Ponce businessman and hacienda holder and mayor of Ponce in 1895. Casa Sauri is said to be the third oldest residence still standing in Ponce.

Re-construction
Munoz Holdings invested $15 million in the restoration and development of the original Casa Sauri property and development of the hotel's modern 5-story tower.

Expansion

In August 2011, hotel owners announced plans to enlarge the hotel with the addition of a casino, a large conference room, a second restaurant, and 150 additional parking spaces. The plans called for the development of the property immediately to the south of the current historic Casa Saurí, a property which also faces Plaza Muñoz Rivera. The new casino would boast 9,500 square feet of space, and the new conference rooms would be able to accommodate 200 people in a space of 6,000 square feet. The planned parking garage opened two years later, in 2013. The casino opened in February 2013, together with the 4-story, 200-car parking garage.

See also

 History of the Autonomous City of Ponce
 List of hotels in Puerto Rico
 List of casinos in Puerto Rico

References

External links
 Photo of Casa Sauri (now (2020), Ponce Plaza Hotel & Casino) during the 1910s when it housed Liceo Ponceño, Puerto Rico's first girls-only school. Liceo Ponceño occupied the structure until the 1950s. (See Luis Fortuño Janeiro. Album Histórico de Ponce (1692-1963). Page 374. Ponce, Puerto Rico: Imprenta Fortuño. 1963.) Retrieved 11 July 2020.)

Hotels in Ponce, Puerto Rico
Houses in Puerto Rico
Casinos in Puerto Rico
Houses completed in 1882
Hotels established in 2009
2009 establishments in Puerto Rico
Companies based in Ponce, Puerto Rico
1882 establishments in Puerto Rico